Ade Komarudin (born 20 May 1965) is an Indonesian politician.

Career
Ade Komarudin who was born on 20 May 1965 in Purwakarta, West Java.

In January 2016 Komarudin became the Speaker of the House of Representatives succeeding Fadli Zon. He has been a member of the House of Representatives since 1997 as a member of Golkar Party.

Scandal 
In November 2016 the Indonesian honorary court dismissed Komarudin as the Speaker of the House of Representatives because he was found guilty of transferring a number of state-owned enterprises (BUMN) to become partners with Commission XI.

In September 2018 the Indonesian Supreme Court announced that Komarudin was involved in the e-KTP mega-corruption along with two other defendants.

References

1965 births
Indonesian politicians
Living people
People from Purwakarta Regency